Self Portrait is an album by Japanese pianist Junko Onishi, released on Aplil 29, 1998 in Japan.

Track listing

Eulogia II personnel
Junko Onishi - Piano
Yasushi Yonekii - Bass
Motohiko Hino - Drums

Production
Recording and Mixing Engineer - Shunichi Kogai
Cover Photograph - Kunihiro Takuma
Inner Photograph - Kunihiro Takuma, Edouard Curchod, Norman Saito

External links

Junko Onishi HP

 

1998 compilation albums
Junko Onishi albums